Visa requirements for Panamanian citizens are administrative entry restrictions by the authorities of other states placed on citizens of Panama. As of 13 April 2021, Panamanian citizens had visa-free or visa on arrival access to 142 countries and territories, ranking the Panamanian passport 34th in terms of travel freedom according to the Henley Passport Index.



Visa requirements map

Visa requirements 
Visa requirements for holders of normal passports traveling for tourist purposes:

Dependent, Disputed, or Restricted territories
Unrecognized or partially recognized countries

Dependent and autonomous territories

See also

Visa policy of Panama
Panamanian passport

References and Notes
References

Notes

Panama
Foreign relations of Panama